Mr. & Mrs. Something are an American indie folk duo of Bino and Chelsea Peck. They originally met while they were attending Azusa Pacific University in Azusa, California, in 2008. They have released two studio albums, The Closure Soundtrack and Setting Sail, a studio EP, "The Nativity EP," and have contributed to several soundtracks.

Background
Mr. & Mrs. Something are a husband-and-wife duo from the cities of Oceanside, California and Seattle, Washington, while they met for the first time in college together in 2008, at Azusa Pacific University, forming the group with a couple of harmonica sessions. He is Benjamin Leonard "Bino" Peck, who was born February 24, 1987, in Oceanside, California, with two older brothers, Jerome and Joseph. She is Chelsea Kothra Peck (née; Lidstrom), who was born in Seattle, Washington on March 22, 1988, where she was raised with a younger brother Sean.

Music history
The duo started in 2012, with their first studio album, The Closure Soundtrack, releasing in 2013. Their subsequent studio album, Setting Sail, was released on November 17, 2015.

Members
 Benjamin Leonard "Bino" Peck (born February 24, 1987 in Oceanside, California)
 Chelsea Kothra Peck (née, Lidstrom, born March 22, 1988, in Seattle, Washington)

Discography
Studio albums
 The Closure Soundtrack (2013)
 Setting Sail (November 17, 2015)

References

External links
 Official website

American musical duos
Musical groups from San Diego
Musical groups from Seattle
2010 establishments in California
2010 establishments in Washington (state)
Musical groups established in 2010